Gohad is a city and a municipality in Bhind district in the Indian state of Madhya Pradesh. A town of historical importance it is situated close to the city of Gwalior. The Gohad Fort is located here.

Geography
Gohad has an average elevation of 159 metres (521 feet).

Demographics
 India census, Gohad had a population of 45,194. Males constitute 55% of the population and females 45%. Gohad has an average literacy rate of 57%, lower than the national average of 59.5%: male literacy is 68%, and female literacy is 44%. In Gohad, 17% of the population is under 6 years of age.

See also
Kirat Singh
Karwas
Guhisar
Utila Fort
Endori
Gohad State

References

Cities and towns in Bhind district